Walker Township is one of twenty-four townships in Hancock County, Illinois, USA.  As of the 2010 census, its population was 333 and it contained 163 housing units.

Geography

Unincorporated towns
 Breckenridge at 
 Sutter at 
 Tioga at 
(This list is based on USGS data and may include former settlements.)

Cemeteries
The township contains these seven cemeteries: Bethany, Bethlehem Church of Christ, Buckeye, Grant, Salem Church-Sutter, Walker and West Tioga.

Major highways
  Illinois Route 96

Demographics

School districts
 Community Unit School District 4
 Southeastern Community Unit School District 337
 Warsaw Community Unit School District 316

Political districts
 Illinois's 18th congressional district
 State House District 94
 State Senate District 47

References
 United States Census Bureau 2008 TIGER/Line Shapefiles
 
 United States National Atlas

External links
 City-Data.com
 Illinois State Archives
 Township Officials of Illinois

Townships in Hancock County, Illinois
Townships in Illinois